The Donglin Academy (Wade–Giles Tung-lin), also known as the Guishan Academy (龜山書院 Guīshān Shūyuàn), was a former Chinese educational institution in Wuxi, China. It was originally built in 1111 during the Northern Song dynasty; the neo-Confucian scholar Yang Shi taught there, but the academy later fell into disuse and disrepair. The name "Donglin" was inspired by the Donglin Temple at the base of Mountain Lu, Jiujiang. Yang Shi visited the Donglin Temple and felt that it was a good place for teaching. When he finished his scholarship, he travelled to Wuxi and saw that the layout of the academy was similar to the Donglin Temple, so he taught at that site for 18 years. The academy was thus called "Donglin Academy".

History
In 1604, during the Wanli era of the Ming dynasty, Gu Xiancheng (1550–1612), a Grand Secretary, along with the scholars Gao Panlong (高攀龍; 1562–1626),  Qian Yiben, An Xifan (1564–1621) and Yu Kongjian restored the Donglin Academy with financial backing from the local gentry and officials such as Ouyang Dongfeng, the governor of Changzhou, and Lin Zai, the county magistrate of Wuxi. The academy gave its name to the resulting Donglin movement.

In 1626, the academy was brutally destroyed, leaving only part of the stone memorial arch. The contemporary academy was a reconstruction during the Qing dynasty by the Yongzheng and Qianlong emperors to win the support of Han Chinese scholars living in Wuxi.

The government of the People's Republic of China redecorated the academy between 1981 and 1982.

References

Confucian education
Confucianism in China
1111 establishments in Asia
History of education in China
Chinese philosophy
Song dynasty
12th-century establishments in China
Ming dynasty architecture
Major National Historical and Cultural Sites in Jiangsu
Confucian academies in Jiangsu
Education in Wuxi